Mónica Alejandra Godoy Cabezas (born May 9, 1976) is a Chilean actress. She was born in Santiago, and began her career at the Chilean channel Televisión Nacional de Chile.  The actress was notably successful for her role of Scarlette in the telenovela Aquelarre. Ms. Godoy is currently working with the soap operas Hijos del Monte, 40 y Tantos and El Laberinto de Alicia.

Biography

Career
She debuted on television as host on Canal 2 Rock & Pop, when she was 19 years. She subsequently participated in six successful dramatic productions of National Television of Chile, playing various characters that allowed Monica to demonstrate her talent and charisma.

Probably by the press, many people who know, know who was living in Barcelona. Left for this city on January 16, 2001 at the end of the recordings of Santo Ladrón, motivated to meet new concerns and find the tools to effectively perform as an actress and get the experience of living abroad. He also participated in the Spanish film XXL, directed by Julio Sánchez Valdés, next to Oscar Jaenada.

In 2004 he returned to Chile and back to the Televisión Nacional de Chile dramatic area to participate in dramatic productions Destinos Cruzados, uneven and Love by accident.
In 2008 participated in Hijos del Monte, her portrayal of Julieta Millán caused great empathy in viewers, playing it down the lead role of María Elena Swett.

In 2010 production is part of the night 40 y Tantos, where she played Susana Jerez, the leading character's lover. Prosperiormente part in the TV series on Child Abuse, El Laberinto de Alicia, playing Bettina Molinari, sister of Alice.

During the 2011 is part of the winning National Television Council of Chile, with the production  Bim Bam Bum and series El Diario Secreto de una Profesional (Adaptation of Secret Diary of a Call Girl). In the latter was chosen to play the lead in the series at first, but following the unexpected pregnancy had to leave the project due to the incompatibility of their status with the extension of the recordings.

Filmography

References

External links
 

1976 births
Chilean film actresses
Chilean television actresses
Chilean telenovela actresses
Chilean television presenters
Chilean people of English descent
Living people
People from Santiago
Chilean women television presenters